The 2020–21 DePaul Blue Demons men's basketball team represented DePaul University during the 2020–21 NCAA Division I men's basketball season. They were led by sixth-year (ninth overall with DePaul) head coach Dave Leitao and played their home games at Wintrust Arena in Chicago, Illinois as members of the Big East Conference. In a season limited due to the ongoing COVID-19 pandemic, the Demons finished the season 5–14, 2–13 in Big East play to finish in last place. They defeated Providence in the first round of the Big East tournament before losing to UConn in the quarterfinals. 

After finishing in last place in the Big East for a fifth consecutive year, the school fired head coach Leitao on March 15, 2021. On April 1, the school named longtime Oregon assistant Tony Stubblefield the team's new head coach.

Previous season
The Blue Demons finished the 2019–20 season 16–16, 3–15 in Big East play to finish in last place. They defeated Xavier in the first round of the Big East tournament before the remaining tournament was canceled due to the COVID-19 pandemic.

Offseason

Departures

Incoming transfers

2020 recruiting class

Roster

Schedule and results 
Due to the ongoing coronavirus pandemic, the start of the season was pushed back from the scheduled start of November 10. On September 16, 2020, the NCAA announced that November 25 would be the new start date. On November 19, the school announced that it was pausing all men's basketball activities due to positive COVID-19 test results and canceled the first three games of the season. On January 2, 2021, the game against St. John's was postponed due to COVID-19 issues at St. John's. On January 4, the January 5 game against Villanova was postponed due to COVID-19 issues at Villanova.

|-
!colspan=9 style=|Regular season

|-
!colspan=9 style=|Big East tournament

Source

References

DePaul Blue Demons men's basketball seasons
DePaul
DePaul